Korkitony is a village near Chebiemit village, Elgeyo-Marakwet County, Kenya. It is part of Kapchemutwa location of Kamariny Division of Keiyo District. Its local authority is Keiyo County Council and constituency is Keiyo North.

It is the birthplace of famous runner Brimin Kipruto.

Elgeyo-Marakwet County
Populated places in Rift Valley Province